() is a fishing town in Mulegé Municipality, Baja California Sur, Mexico.

Several lighthouses are situated near the town.

 was named by Francisco de Bolaños, whose expedition reached the headland, but no further.  means "open your eyes", and refers to the treacherous sailing conditions, with many rocks and reefs.

 is reached by a long road with few features of interest. It comprises 500 houses, some grocery stores, an airstrip, a fish packing plant, a hardware store, churches, schools and a medical clinic. The town's main economic output is in fishing for California spiny lobster and abalone.

See also
Punta Abreojos Airstrip
History of the west coast of North America

References

Bibliography

Populated places in Baja California Sur
Populated coastal places in Mexico